U.S. Route 422 (US 422) is a  long spur route of US 22 split into two segments in the U.S. states of Ohio and Pennsylvania. The western segment of US 422 runs from downtown Cleveland, Ohio, east to Ebensburg, Pennsylvania. The eastern segment, located entirely within Pennsylvania, runs from Hershey east to King of Prussia, near Philadelphia. US 422 Business (US 422 Bus.) serves as a business route into each of four towns along the way.

The segmented nature of US 422 violates American Association of State Highway and Transportation Officials (AASHTO) numbering conventions, as two separate roadways traditionally do not carry the same route number. However, the two sections of US 422 are connected by US 22 and US 322, allowing them to carry the same designation.

In downtown Cleveland, the western terminus of the western segment of US 422 is at US 6, US 20, US 42, and State Route 3 (SR 3) in Cleveland's Public Square, while the eastern terminus of the western segment is at an interchange with US 219 near Ebensburg. In Hershey, the eastern segment of US 422 begins at an interchange with US 322 and Pennsylvania Route 39 (PA 39), while the eastern terminus of the eastern segment is at an interchange with US 202 near King of Prussia. US 422 is named the Benjamin Franklin Highway in Pennsylvania in honor of Benjamin Franklin.

Originally, US 422 was routed along existing roads, but much of the route now runs along purpose-built alignments.

Route description

Western segment

Ohio
The western section of US 422 begins at US 6 and US 20 at the center of Cleveland's Public Square in the downtown district. US 422 and SR 14, which shares its western terminus with that of US 422, form a concurrency as the roadway heads south from the square. Less than a mile from the Public Square, US 422 and SR 14 intersect the Cleveland Innerbelt, the confluence of Interstate 90 (I-90) and the northern termini of I-71 and I-77. US 422 and SR 14 split at the interchange as SR 14 turns south to join SR 43.  SR 8 begins at the eastern terminus of the US 422/SR 14 overlap, forming a concurrency with US 422 along Woodland Avenue. 

US 422 runs easterly along Woodland Avenue and Kinsman Road, through the Kinsman neighborhood. As it crosses Cleveland's city limits just west of Lee Road in Shaker Heights, the street name changes to Chagrin Boulevard, named for the Chagrin River and Chagrin Falls (the eastern terminus of the boulevard) in Cleveland's eastern suburbs. Today, US 422 in Shaker Heights and Beachwood, where it now merges with I-271, is almost a linear edge city, with millions of square feet in office space centered on this corridor. It is one of the busiest streets in Cuyahoga County and Greater Cleveland. It serves as the primary commercial district for the wealthiest pocket of communities in Northeast Ohio.

At Northfield Road, SR 8 turns to the south, leaving US 422 to continue east along Chagrin Boulevard. Two miles east of SR 8 in Beachwood, US 422 intersects SR 87 and SR 175, running concurrent with the former for two blocks to I-271 exit 29. At Exit 27, US 422 splits from I-271 and proceeds through the eastern suburbs of Cleveland as a limited-access highway, exiting Cuyahoga County and entering Geauga County.

In Auburn Township, US 422 returns to grade-level upon crossing the LaDue Reservoir. The route continues to the southeast, cutting through northeast Portage County and then entering Trumbull County, where US 422 runs through the center of Warren and Girard. The section from downtown Warren to SR 46 is known as "The Strip" and is lined with shopping centers, fast-food restaurants and other retail establishments, including the Eastwood Mall. In the 1960s and 1970s, nightclubs along The Strip attracted top-name entertainers.

Farther southeast, US 422 enters Youngstown and Mahoning County before entering Pennsylvania.

Pennsylvania

Three miles northwest of New Castle the route spurs off to bypass New Castle running along with I-376. I-376 spurs off and becomes a toll road, while US 422 continues onward to where it becomes a two-lane road with a center lane three miles southwest of New Castle. The route continues to the east where it meets with US 19 and adjacent I-79. The road becomes an expressway again after its intersection with I-79 through Moraine State Park. The expressway ends just north of Prospect by the Big Butler Fairgrounds. It proceeds further for four miles to where it becomes an expressway bypassing Butler, and ending in East Butler. It continues on for fifteen miles, becoming an expressway again to bypass Kittanning, where it meets with the Allegheny Valley Expressway (PA 28) at the northern terminus of that expressway. At this point, PA 28 joins US 422 in a concurrency. US 422/PA 28 crosses over the Allegheny River and PA 66 joins US 422 and PA 28 on the expressway. At the east end of the expressway, PA 28/PA 66 splits to the north and US 422 becomes a two-lane highway with a center lane. It continues in this way for eighteen miles to where it bypasses Indiana, where it junctions with US 119. The expressway continues for eight miles to where the expressway ends north of Yellow Creek State Park, becoming a two-lane highway. It continues like this for sixteen miles, until just before its terminus at US 219 near Ebensburg.

Eastern segment

Dauphin and Lebanon counties

The eastern section of US 422 begins at a partial cloverleaf interchange with US 322 and the eastern terminus of PA 39 east of the borough of Hummelstown in Derry Township, Dauphin County, heading northeast as a four-lane freeway that soon ends and becomes an at-grade divided highway called West Chocolate Avenue. The road passes commercial development along with some farm fields and residential development as it heads into the community of Hershey. The route heads into a mix of homes and businesses and turns east-northeast, where it narrows to a two-lane undivided road. At this point, West Chocolate Avenue becomes lined with street lamps that are shaped like Hershey's Kisses. US 422 continues along West Chocolate Avenue and comes to an intersection with PA 743 at Cocoa Avenue in the center of Hershey. At this point, the route becomes East Chocolate Avenue, a three-lane divided with two eastbound lanes and one westbound lane that passes southeast of the site of the original Hershey Chocolate factory. The road becomes undivided, still with two eastbound lanes and one westbound lane, and passes near a few residences and businesses as it heads between the Hershey Country Club to the north and Spring Creek Golf Course to the south, narrowing to two lanes. US 422 runs past more residential and commercial development, leaving Hershey and heading through the community of Palmdale.

US 422 enters the borough of Palmyra in Lebanon County and becomes West Main Street, running past homes and a few businesses. The route heads into the downtown area and the name changes to East Main Street at the Railroad Street intersection. The road runs past residences before it passes through commercial areas and comes to an intersection with the northern terminus of PA 117. US 422 gains a center left-turn lane and continues past businesses, leaving Palmyra for North Londonderry Township and becoming Benjamin Franklin Parkway. The route bends east and passes between businesses to the north and residential development to the south before it heads into farmland and crosses Killinger Creek, where it becomes the border between North Annville Township to the north and South Annville Township to the south as West Main Street. The road heads through agricultural areas with some woods, homes, and businesses, crossing the Quittapahilla Creek into Annville Township. At this point, US 422 heads east as a two-lane road that is lined with homes. In the commercial center of Annville, the route crosses PA 934 and becomes East Main Street, heading south of the Lebanon Valley College campus. The road continues east past residential areas with a few businesses, gaining a center left-turn lane. US 422 heads into the borough of Cleona and becomes West Penn Avenue, heading past homes and commercial establishments. The route becomes East Penn Avenue at the Center Street intersection and runs through more developed areas, becoming the border between Cleona to the north and North Cornwall Township to the south. The road becomes the boundary between North Lebanon Township to the north and North Cornwall Township to the south and the name changes to Cumberland Street. US 422 heads east past businesses and passes to the south of the Lebanon Valley Mall. The route runs along the border between West Lebanon Township to the north and North Cornwall Township to the south as it continues through commercial areas with a few homes.

US 422 enters the city of Lebanon at the 16th Street intersection, where it becomes a four-lane undivided road that passes commercial development and encounters an abandoned railroad line at the north end of the Lebanon Valley Rail Trail. At 12th Street, the route crosses Quittapahilla Creek and splits into a one-way pair following Cumberland Street westbound and Walnut Street eastbound, with each street carrying two lanes of traffic. US 422 continues east past urban rowhomes along with a few businesses, intersecting the southbound direction of PA 72 at 10th Street and the northbound direction of PA 72 at 9th Street. The westbound direction heads through the downtown area of Lebanon, passing south of the Harrisburg Area Community College Lebanon Campus, while the eastbound direction heads through residential areas to the south of downtown. Farther east, US 422 passes urban areas of homes and businesses in the eastern part of Lebanon, with the eastbound direction passing north of WellSpan Good Samaritan Hospital. On the eastern border of Lebanon, the route comes to an intersection with the northern terminus of PA 897. At this, westbound US 422 becomes the border between Lebanon to the north and South Lebanon Township to the south, briefly becoming a three-lane divided highway with two westbound lanes and one eastbound lane between PA 897 and North 5th Avenue before becoming a one-way road again, while eastbound US 422 fully enters South Lebanon Township, heading past residential areas in the community of Hebron. Eastbound US 422 turns north and passes businesses, crossing Quittapahilla Creek and rejoining westbound US 422 at East Cumberland Street. At this point, US 422 heads northeast as four-lane undivided East Cumberland Street past businesses, passing through a corner of Lebanon before entering North Lebanon Township and coming to a bridge over Norfolk Southern's Harrisburg Line as it passes north of the community of Avon. The route becomes a three-lane road with a center left-turn lane and runs along the border between North Lebanon Township to the northwest and South Lebanon Township to the southeast, heading through residential areas in the community of Avon Heights. The road heads into a mix of farmland and residential and commercial development. US 422 enters Jackson Township and becomes West Lincoln Avenue, crossing the Tulpehocken Creek and continuing through agricultural areas with some homes and businesses. The route heads into business areas and enters the borough of Myerstown, where it reaches an intersection with the southern terminus of PA 645. The road becomes a four-lane divided highway and crosses PA 501 before becoming East Lincoln Avenue at the Railroad Street intersection. US 422 leaves Myerstown for Jackson Township again and becomes a three-lane road with a center turn lane, heading east through farmland with some commercial development. The road intersects Wintersville Road/Millardsville Road, where it briefly become a divided highway before regaining a center left-turn lane.

Berks County
US 422 crosses into Marion Township in Berks County and becomes Conrad Weiser Parkway, passing through farm fields with some residences and businesses. The route runs past homes and businesses in the community of Stouchsburg before it runs through more agricultural areas with some development, bending to the east-southeast. The road becomes three lanes with two westbound lanes and one eastbound lane, crossing the Tulpehocken Creek into the borough of Womelsdorf. Here, US 422 turns into a four-lane divided highway and passes businesses as it comes to an intersection with PA 419. The route continues southeast near residential areas before it leaves Womelsdorf for Heidelberg Township and passes to the north of the Conrad Weiser Homestead. US 422 heads east-southeast as West Penn Avenue, a three-lane road with a center turn lane that heads through rural areas with residential and commercial development. The road runs a short distance to the north of Norfolk Southern's Harrisburg Line before it enters the borough of Robesonia. Here, the route runs along two-lane West Penn Avenue and is lined with homes and a few businesses. US 422 becomes East Penn Avenue at the Robeson Street intersection and passes more development. The road heads back into Heidelberg Township and gains a center left-turn lane, heading southeast past commercial development and to the south of Conrad Weiser High School. The route passes through a corner of Lower Heidelberg Township and becomes West Penn Avenue, soon forming the boundary between Lower Heidelberg Township to the northeast and South Heidelberg Township to the southwest. US 422 passes through farmland with some homes and businesses before it enters the borough of Wernersville. Here, the route becomes two-lane West Penn Avenue and passes through residential areas with a few businesses. The road becomes East Penn Avenue in the commercial center of town and continues east past more homes. US 422 leaves Wernersville and once again follows the border between Lower Heidelberg Township to the north and South Heidelberg Township to the south along Penn Avenue. The road gains a center turn lane and runs through agricultural areas with some residences and commercial establishments. The route crosses the Cacoosing Creek into the borough of Sinking Spring and becomes two lanes, following Penn Avenue past a mix of homes and businesses. In the eastern part of Sinking Spring, US 422 widens to four lanes and comes to an intersection with the western terminus of PA 724. Past this intersection, the road becomes three lanes with a center turn lane and continues through residential and commercial areas, leaving Sinking Spring for Spring Township, where it passes through the community of Springmont. The route continues east through developed areas and heads through the community of West Lawn. US 422 enters the borough of Wyomissing and widens to a four-lane divided highway. Here, it comes to an interchange with the US 222 freeway and the western terminus of US 422 Bus., which continues east along Penn Avenue.

At this interchange, US 422 becomes concurrent with US 222, and the two routes continue east-northeast along the six-lane Warren Street Bypass, a freeway that runs between residential areas to the northwest and Norfolk Southern's Harrisburg Line to the southeast. The freeway curves north into business areas and comes to a partial cloverleaf interchange with State Hill Road. Following this, US 222/US 422 passes between the Berkshire Mall to the west and commercial areas to the east before it reaches an interchange with Paper Mill Road and Crossing Drive, where it curves to the northeast and runs near more businesses. The freeway comes to an interchange where US 222 splits to the northwest, US 422 immediately afterward splits southeast along the West Shore Bypass, and, straight ahead, PA 12 begins northeast along the Warren Street Bypass. Following this interchange, US 422 heads southeast along the West Shore Bypass, a four-lane freeway that runs between residential areas to the southwest and the Tulpehocken Creek to the northeast. The road passes under Norfolk Southern's Reading Line and comes to a diamond interchange with North Wyomissing Boulevard. The route follows the west bank of the Schuylkill River as it continues southeast and passes under Norfolk Southern's Harrisburg Line #2, crossing into the borough of West Reading. US 422 runs between the river to the northeast and Norfolk Southern's Harrisburg Line #1 to the southwest before reaching a cloverleaf interchange with US 422 Bus. Following this, the freeway heads south between the Schuylkill River to the east and industrial areas to the west, passing through a small exclave of Cumru Township and crossing over the Schuylkill River Trail. The road curves southeast and crosses Wyomissing Creek into the city of Reading, where it runs along the riverbank and comes to an interchange with US 222 Bus. that has left exits and entrances. From here, the route heads southeast between wooded areas near the Schuylkill River to the northeast and the Schuylkill River Trail and urbanized areas to the southwest. The freeway turns east and crosses the river into Cumru Township, where it passes through woodland and comes to a bridge over Norfolk Southern's Harrisburg Line. US 422 crosses the Schuylkill River again and reaches a trumpet interchange with the northern terminus of I-176. The road crosses the river a third time and enters Exeter Township, passing over Norfolk Southern's Harrisburg Line #2 and running between residential areas to the north and industrial areas to the south before reaching an eastbound exit and westbound entrance with Neversink Road that provides access to the borough of Mount Penn. From here, US 422 passes near more development before it comes to a westbound exit and eastbound entrance with the eastern terminus of US 422 Bus., at which point the freeway ends.

From here, US 422 heads southeast as Perkiomen Avenue, a four-lane divided highway with occasional jughandles that is lined with businesses. The route passes north of the community of Lorane as it continues through suburban residential and commercial development, crossing Antietam Creek. The road runs southeast through a mix of woodland and development before the eastbound and westbound lanes split as it reaches an intersection with the northern terminus of PA 345 in the community of Baumstown. Following this intersection, US 422 continues east as a one-way pair through wooded areas with some residences and businesses, crossing into Amity Township. Both directions of the route rejoin and the route heads southeast as four-lane divided Benjamin Franklin Highway, crossing Monocacy Creek and passing farm fields before running through wooded areas with some commercial development. The road passes south of a residential development before the eastbound and westbound lanes split again, running a short distance to the north of Norfolk Southern's Harrisburg Line. US 422 curves southeast and heads into businesses areas, coming to an intersection with the southern terminus of PA 662 in the community of Douglassville. Following this, the route curves to the east before both directions rejoin. US 422 splits from Benjamin Franklin Highway by heading southeast onto a four-lane freeway called the Pottstown Bypass at an eastbound exit and westbound entrance. Benjamin Franklin Highway continues east and the road runs through the borough of Pottstown as High Street before becoming Ridge Pike east of Pottstown. Past the split with Benjamin Franklin Highway, the freeway passes over Norfolk Southern's Harrisburg Line and the Schuylkill River Trail before it enters Douglass Township and heads east-southeast through wooded areas to the north of the Schuylkill River.

Montgomery and Chester counties

US 422 enters West Pottsgrove Township in Montgomery County and comes to an interchange with Grosstown Road that provides access to the community of Stowe. The freeway curves northeast and continues to follow the Schuylkill River before it turns east and passes through a corner of the borough of Pottstown prior to crossing the river. At this point, the route enters North Coventry Township in Chester County and runs between woods to the north and farm fields to the south before passing near development and coming to a cloverleaf interchange with PA 100. Past this interchange, the road heads through the community of South Pottstown, which is across the river from the borough of Pottstown, and comes to a westbound exit and eastbound entrance with South Hanover Street. US 422 passes through woodland and reaches an eastbound exit and westbound entrance at Keim Street. A short distance later, the route comes to a trumpet interchange connecting to PA 724 to the south in the community of Kenilworth. From here, the road turns northeast and crosses the Schuylkill River into Lower Pottsgrove Township in Montgomery County, reaching a diamond interchange with Armand Hammer Boulevard in an industrial area. The freeway passes over Norfolk Southern's Pottstown Industrial Track and Harrisburg Line before running near residential and commercial development and turning to the east. US 422 heads between the community of Sanatoga to the north and woodland to the south before it reaches a partial cloverleaf interchange with Evergreen Road that provides access to Sanatoga. This interchange marks the end of the Pottstown Bypass designation of the US 422 freeway.

From here, the four-lane US 422 freeway continues southeast as the Pottstown Expressway into Limerick Township and passes between the Philadelphia Premium Outlets to the southwest and Heritage Field Airport to the northeast, with the Limerick Generating Station, a nuclear power plant, located further to the southwest. The road runs near a mix of farmland and residential and commercial development, coming to a diamond interchange with Lewis Road that provides access to the communities of Limerick and Linfield. A park and ride lot is located within the southwest quadrant of this interchange. The route continues near more suburban development and reaches a diamond interchange with Township Line Road in a commercial area that serves the borough of Trappe to the northeast and the borough of Royersford to the southwest. Past this interchange, the freeway enters Upper Providence Township and continues southeast past suburban housing developments. US 422 passes over PA 113 without an interchange before coming to a partial cloverleaf interchange with PA 29 that serves the borough of Collegeville to the northeast and the borough of Phoenixville the southwest. The Providence Town Center shopping center is located along PA 29 north of this interchange. Following this interchange, the road runs near office parks before heading through wooded areas with some farm fields, with the median widening. The route passes near housing developments and office complexes before the median narrows and it curves to the south. The freeway comes to a partial cloverleaf interchange with Egypt Road in the community of Oaks. From here, US 422 passes between a commercial area that includes the 422 Business Center office park (where the American Treasure Tour is located) and the Greater Philadelphia Expo Center to the west and the Lower Perkiomen Valley Park to the east.

The road crosses the Perkiomen Trail and the Perkiomen Creek into Lower Providence Township and becomes parallel to the Schuylkill River Trail to the west, making a sharp turn to the east and passing through woods and fields within Valley Forge National Historical Park. The route comes to a partial cloverleaf interchange with the southern terminus of PA 363 that provides access to the communities of Audubon and Trooper, where it enters West Norriton Township and makes a turn to the south, gaining a third auxiliary lane in each direction. US 422 heads over the Schuylkill River Trail before it crosses the Schuylkill River on the Schuylkill River Crossing Complex east of the parallel Sullivan's Bridge into Upper Merion Township, where it becomes the County Line Expressway. The freeway passes over Norfolk Southern's Harrisburg Line before reaching a partial cloverleaf interchange with PA 23 to the east of the Visitor Center at Valley Forge National Historical Park. From here, the route heads into the community of King of Prussia as a four-lane freeway and passes to the west of business parks and the Valley Forge Casino Resort, coming to an eastbound exit and entrance with First Avenue that serves the business parks and the casino. At this point, the road enters Tredyffrin Township in Chester County and runs a short distance west of the border with Upper Merion Township in Montgomery County. The freeway passes under the Pennsylvania Turnpike (I-76) and heads near commercial areas west of the Village at Valley Forge, a residential and retail development which contains the King of Prussia Town Center lifestyle center. US 422 comes to its eastern terminus at a trumpet interchange with the US 202 freeway that also has ramps connecting to Swedesford Road and I-76 eastbound (Schuylkill Expressway) to the city of Philadelphia. US 202 northbound provides access from US 422 to I-76 westbound and the Pennsylvania Turnpike at the western terminus of I-276 at the Valley Forge interchange along with the King of Prussia shopping mall.

History

Western segment
The western segment was first signed in 1926.

Ohio
Most of the highway in Ohio still runs along its original alignment. The section in Parkman Township, Geauga County was twinned during World War II. The four-lane divided highway was extended to Warren by 1950. In 1971, an expressway bypass around downtown Youngstown opened.

The divided highway portion of US 422 connecting downtown Solon to I-271 and I-480 was originally signed as US 422 Alternate. In December 1992, the freeway was extended eastward through Bainbridge Township across the LaDue Reservoir to SR 44 in Auburn Center, and US 422 was rerouted along I-271 and the former US 422 Alternate. The new freeway made US 422 a popular route for truckers and commuters and made the remaining two-lane portion in Geauga County particularly dangerous. The state has added traffic lights, rumble strips and extra width to the road to try to alleviate some of the danger.

Prior to the realignment, US 422 originally ran along Chagrin Boulevard (formerly Kinsman Road) and Washington Street through Woodmere, Pepper Pike, Moreland Hills, Chagrin Falls and Bainbridge Township.

Pennsylvania
The expressway bypass of Butler was built in the early 1960s. Previously, the road ran through downtown Butler. The section that runs through Moraine State Park near Butler was upgraded to expressway standards in 1969. In the 1970s, bypasses were built around the cities of New Castle, Kittanning, and Indiana. Sections of the Indiana bypass remained incomplete until 1995 and the Kittanning bypasses were completed in 2000.

Eastern segment

Reading

In the 1960s, US 422 in the Reading area was rerouted from surface streets through downtown Reading onto bypasses built south of the city. The former routing of US 422 through the city became US 422 Bus.

On June 22, 2000, the section of US 422 between US 422 Bus. and Shelbourne Road, along with US 422 Bus. between PA 562 and the eastern terminus at US 422, in Exeter Township was designated by an act of the Pennsylvania General Assembly as the Albert Boscov Commemorative Highway in honor of Albert Boscov, the longtime CEO of the department store chain Boscov's.

Pottstown to King of Prussia
Before it became highways, US 422 ran on surface roads through Pottstown and Sanatoga (High Street), Limerick and Collegeville (Ridge Pike, occasionally referred to locally as "Old 422"), Plymouth Meeting, and the Germantown section of Philadelphia (via Germantown Pike and Germantown Avenue), terminating in different places in Philadelphia over time. (The later running of US 422 on expressway from Pottstown to King of Prussia removed US 422 from Philadelphia.) As of 2022, the overpass of Ridge Pike over the Pennsylvania Turnpike (I-276) is still painted with a designation of "U.S. 422". At the same time, a segment of highway was built from King of Prussia to Trooper, terminating at the Betzwood Bridge. It took roughly another twenty years for the remaining segments between Sanatoga and Trooper to be completed, finally connecting the highway route to King of Prussia. Eastbound on US 422, the median strip widens just after the Sanatoga exit, as the road leaves the old Pottstown bypass completed in the late 1970s.

In the first decade of the 2000s, this segment of US 422 saw traffic volume increase by 50%. Volume reached 45,000 vehicles per day at Pottstown, and 110,000 vehicles per day at the bridge crossing the Schuylkill.

At the federal level, the Schuylkill Valley Metro was proposed to connect Philadelphia to Reading. This rail service would have paralleled US 422 from King of Prussia into Berks County. It failed when the bloated price tag of $1.3 billion did not receive federal funding in 2006.

Construction of a third westbound lane between PA 23 and PA 363 began in February 2008 and was completed roughly a year later. The project restructured the PA 23 interchange and squeezed three westbound lanes onto the existing Schuylkill River crossing, using  lanes and a narrower median guard.

Local planning commissions then created a "US 422 Corridor Master Plan". This plan addressed the future trends of traffic on US 422 through a set of sustainability programs, a proposed extension to SEPTA's Manayunk/Norristown Line regional rail service to Wyomissing (a restoration of rail service between Norristown/Reading/Pottsville that SEPTA abruptly terminated in July 1981), and additional road construction. The plan's rail and construction projects would be funded by tolling the highway. Tolls would be charged on a per-mile basis; driving the entire segment between Pottstown and King of Prussia would cost $2. All tolls would be electronically collected via the E-ZPass system. The plan was debated in local municipalities during 2010, with many adopting the sustainability portions of the plan while objecting to the charging of tolls. On October 5, 2011, under increasing pressure and opposition, the Delaware Valley Regional Planning Commission cancelled the tolling proposal and stated that the highway would be expanded under regular PennDOT programming instead.

In 2013, work began to make the partial interchange with PA 363, which was originally a westbound exit and eastbound entrance, a full interchange by adding a ramp from PA 363 to westbound US 422 and from eastbound US 422 to PA 363. The new ramps opened to traffic on December 1, 2015.

In 2012, PennDOT began a $74 million project to improve the portion of US 422 between PA 724 in North Coventry Township and the bridge over Porter Road in Lower Pottsgrove Township, the first part of a larger project to reconstruct the Pottstown Bypass. The improvement project between PA 724 and Porter Road was completed in November 2018.

The Schuylkill River Crossing Complex bridge that carries US 422 across the Schuylkill River also serves to connect PA 23 and PA 363, which had been the source of much congestion the area.  The $97 million project started construction in the middle of 2016 and was completed in October 2020.  The new bridge replaced a 1960s era bridge that connects Betzwood with Valley Forge.

King of Prussia termination
In the early 2000s, the US 422, US 202, and I-76 interchange in King of Prussia underwent a massive five-year reconstruction project that involved the construction of new ramps and the widening of all intersecting roadways. Several small businesses in the King of Prussia area were demolished as part of this project; the nearby King of Prussia shopping mall complex was also affected.

Major intersections

Related routes
U.S. Route 22
U.S. Route 222
U.S. Route 322
U.S. Route 522
Special routes of U.S. Route 422

See also

Chocolate Avenue

References

External links

Route 422 - John Simpson's Unofficial Ohio State Highways Web Site
Pennsylvania Highways: US 422
US 422 in Pennsylvania at AARoads.com
Ohio Roads - US 422
Pennsylvania Roads - Western US 422
Pennsylvania Roads - Eastern US 422
The Roads of Metro Philadelphia: Pottstown Expressway (US 422)
Endpoints of US 422 at USEnds.com

4
22-4
22-4
22-4
U.S. Route 422
Transportation in Cuyahoga County, Ohio
Transportation in Geauga County, Ohio
Transportation in Portage County, Ohio
Transportation in Trumbull County, Ohio
Transportation in Mahoning County, Ohio
Transportation in Lawrence County, Pennsylvania
Transportation in Butler County, Pennsylvania
Transportation in Armstrong County, Pennsylvania
Transportation in Indiana County, Pennsylvania
Transportation in Cambria County, Pennsylvania
Transportation in Dauphin County, Pennsylvania
Transportation in Lebanon County, Pennsylvania
Transportation in Berks County, Pennsylvania
Transportation in Montgomery County, Pennsylvania
Transportation in Chester County, Pennsylvania